Teressa Raiford (born 1970) is an American activist and politician in Portland, Oregon. She founded the local Black-led non-profit Don't Shoot Portland.

Activism 
When Raiford was a child, her grandparents' restaurant was the site of a racist action in which Portland police officers threw dead possums onto the business' doorstep. The incident prompted substantial protests against racial injustice.

On the morning of September 26, 2010, Raiford's nephew Andre Dupree Payton was shot and killed in downtown Portland. The case remains unsolved. In response, Raiford started Don't Shoot Portland, a group of activists who work for police accountability within the Portland Police Bureau and Multnomah County Sheriff's Office.

In 2015, Raiford was arrested, charged and jailed for obstructing traffic and disorderly conduct by five officers, at a march she had organized to honor Michael Brown. In 2016 the case was dismissed by a jury. In 2017, Raiford filed a countersuit claiming damages of $500,000, claiming she was "signaled  out for her outspokenness against police violence" and claiming officers made disparaging comments as they arrested her. The case was dismissed by a judge in 2019.

In June 2020, Don't Shoot Portland filed a class-action lawsuit against the City of Portland for seeking a temporary restraining order to force the Portland Police Bureau from using tear gas in the city. Don't Shoot Portland also published an in-depth report on Riot Control Agents, describing the irreparable harm caused by RCAs during the COVID-19 pandemic.

In July 2020, Don't Shoot PDX and Wall of Moms filed a federal lawsuit against the U.S. Department of Homeland Security, claiming that President Trump's deployment of federal forces to Portland was unlawful.

In 2022, Raiford was critical of public misinformation provided by the Portland police in the aftermath of the Normandale Park shooting and called for an independent investigation.

Political campaigns

2012 Portland City Council election 
Raiford attempted to unseat Commissioner Amanda Fritz in the 2012 Portland City Council election. She finished in 4th out of 5th place with 3,840 votes (3.21%).

2014 Multnomah County Commission election 
In the 2014 County Commission elections, Raiford attempted to unseat then Commissioner Loretta Smith. Raiford finished 3rd out of 4th place with 1,986 votes (6.56%).

2016 Multnomah County Sheriff election 
Raiford announced a write-in campaign against Mike Reese, former Portland Police chief, who was running unopposed. Reese won with 96.55% of the vote.

2020 Portland Mayoral election 

Raiford announced her plan to run for mayor in late 2017, being one of the first candidates to announce her plan. In late 2019 and early 2020, she began recruiting volunteers and actively campaigning. On May 19, 2020, Raiford lost the primary election to Ted Wheeler and Sarah Iannarone, coming in 3rd place with 18,310 votes (8.40%).

After her defeat in the primary, supporters of Raiford have promoted a write-in campaign, although Raiford has said she won’t be actively campaigning.

References

Living people
Activists from Portland, Oregon
African-American activists
Candidates in the 2012 United States elections
Candidates in the 2014 United States elections
Candidates in the 2016 United States elections
Candidates in the 2020 United States elections
American community activists
21st-century American women politicians
21st-century African-American women
21st-century African-American politicians
21st-century American politicians
1970 births
African-American history in Portland, Oregon